Faumuina is a surname. Notable people with the surname include:
Beatrice Faumuina (born 1974), New Zealand discus thrower.
Charlie Faumuina (born 1986), rugby union player.
Mark Faumuina (born 1971), New Zealand rugby league player.
Sione Faumuina (born 1981), New Zealand rugby league player.
Wilson Faumuina (1954–1986), American football defensive lineman.
Faumuina Sikuka Lomitusi Samoan genealogist and historian

Faumuina